Racing 92 is a French rugby union club based in suburban Paris that was formed in 2001 with the collaboration of the Racing Club de France and US Métro. They were called Racing Métro 92 between 2001 and 2015, when they changed the name to Racing 92. "92" is the number of Hauts-de-Seine, a département of Île-de-France, bordering Paris to the west, where they play, and whose council gives financial backing to the club. They currently play in the Top 14, having been promoted as 2008–09 champions of Rugby Pro D2. After starting the 2017–18 season at the Stade Yves-du-Manoir stadium at Colombes, where the France national team played for several decades, Racing played their first match at the new U Arena, since renamed Paris La Défense Arena, in Nanterre on 22 December 2017.

History

Racing Club was established in 1882 (it became Racing Club de France in 1885) as an athletics club, one of the first in France. New sections were regularly added thereafter (17 as of 2006, accounting for some 20,000 members). A rugby section was founded in 1890, which became an immediate protagonist of the early French championship to which, until 1898, only Parisian teams were invited. On 20 March 1892 the USFSA organised the first ever French rugby championship, a one off game between Racing and Stade Français. The game was refereed by Pierre de Coubertin and saw Racing win 4–3. Racing were awarded the Bouclier de Brennus, which is still awarded to the winners of the French championship today.

Both clubs would contest the championship game the following season as well, though in 1893 it would be Stade Français who would win the event, defeating the Racing Club 7–3. Stade went on to dominate the following years and the Racing Club would make their next final appearance in the 1898 season, where they met Stade yet again. However the title was awarded after a round-robin with six clubs. Stade Français won with 10 points, Racing came in second with 6.

Racing contested the 1900 season final against the Stade Bordelais club, as provincial clubs had been allowed to compete in 1899. Racing easily won the match, defeating Stade Bordelais 37–7. The two clubs would meet again in the 1902 championship game, where Racing would again win, 6–0. A decade passed until Racing Club made another championship final, which would be on 31 March 1912, where they would play Toulouse in Toulouse. They lost the match 8–6.

Due to World War I the French championship was replaced with a competition called the Coupe de l'Espérance. The Racing Club won the competition in 1918, defeating FC Grenoble 22 points to 9. Normal competition resumed for the 1920 season. That season the Racing Club made their first final since 1912, though they lost 8 to 3 to Stadoceste Tarbais, a club from the Pyrénées.

After the 1920 season, the Racing Club would not win any championships for a number of years. In 1931 they created the Challenge Yves du Manoir competition. In the 1950s the club had some success, making their first championship final in 30 years, losing to Castres Olympique, 11 points to 8, becoming runners-up in the Challenge Yves du Manoir and winning the Challenge Rutherford in the 1952 season. After losing the 1957 final to FC Lourdes, the club then won the championship in the 1959 season, defeating Mont-de-Marsan 8 points to 3.

The Racing Club would next play in the championship final in the 1987 season, where they met Toulon at Parc des Princes in Paris. Toulon won the match 15 points to 12. Three seasons later the Racing Club defeated Agen 22 to 12 in Paris, capturing their first title since the 1959 season.

But in the wake of the 1990 title, Racing Club had a hard time adapting to the professional era and started to decline, until they were relegated to Division 2 at the end of the 1995–96 season. They jumped back to the top tier in 1998 but went down again in 2000 and played in Division 2 for most of the next decade. In 2001 the rugby section split off from the general sports club to merge with the rugby section of US Métro, the Paris public transport sports club, to form the current professional concern, known as Racing Métro 92. Both Racing Club de France and US Métro retained their other amateur general sports sections.

Racing 92's president is Jacky Lorenzetti, who heads a giant real estate company called Foncia. When Lorenzetti took over in 2006, the board set goals of bringing Racing into the Top 14 within the next two years and into the Heineken Cup by 2011. They missed their Top 14 goal by one year, not entering the top flight until 2009, but achieved their Heineken Cup goal by qualifying for the 2010–11 edition.

After 2003 the Challenge Yves du Manoir has been taken over by Racing Club as a youth competition for under 15s clubs. Racing Club de France provided 76 players to the national team, including 12 captains. It is second only to Stade Toulousain (almost 100) in that category. Three Racingmen  played in France's first international match against the All Blacks on 1 January 1906. Laurent Cabannes, a France flanker, also played for Harlequins.

At the end of the 2014–15 season, the team's name was shortened from Racing Métro 92 to simply Racing 92.

Identity

Aristocratic exclusivity

In France, early organised sport was a matter for rich people. Racing Club became the epitome of the exclusive athletics club, located in the heart of the Bois de Boulogne in the affluent western district of Paris. As the club's name, Racing, indicates, it was modelled after fashionable English sports organisations, whose ideal of mens sana in corpore sano (a healthy mind in a healthy body) appealed very much to its members.  Many of them were actually aristocrats, and four nobles took part in the first championship final. Although fewer aristocrats belong to the club now, it is still very complicated to join it, and the identity and image is one of exclusivity.

Racing Club has also always defended the amateur spirit of the game and of sports in general. The creation of the Challenge Yves du Manoir responded to this ideal in a period (late 1920s–early 1930s) where French rugby was marred by violence and undergoing creeping professionalism. Yves du Manoir symbolised the romantic side of rugby, its carefree dimension, le jeu pour le jeu (playing for the fun of playing).

Modern eccentricity
In a very different vein, much later, in the 1980s, a talented generation of players revived the club's spirit. They carried it back to the top of French rugby thanks to their performances on the pitch, but they also wanted to bring the fun back into the game, to take rugby out of its Parisian anonymity. They did so through a combination of serious football, humour and self-mockery. Their famous antics were invented by the club's backs (including France flyhalf Franck Mesnel and France wing Jean-Baptiste Lafond) who once played a game in Bayonne with berets on their heads as a tribute to the tradition of attacking play of the Basque club Aviron Bayonnais (11 Jan 1987). As members of a gang which they called le show bizz, they played other matches with black make-up on (10 April 1988 at Stade Toulousain), hair dyed yellow, bald caps (26 Feb 1989 against Béziers), wigs and even dressed up as pelote players (white shirts, black jackets and berets, again) in March 1990 at Biarritz Olympique. In April 1989, they wore long red and white striped shorts to celebrate the sans-culotte who took the Bastille on 14 July 1789. They wore long white trousers to look like players of old in the French championship semi-final on 26 April 1987—and won. Their best prank was in the next game though: they played the 1987 final against Toulon with a pink bow tie (2 May). Just before kick-off, Lafond presented French president François Mitterrand, who always attended the national final, with one of those bow ties. They lost that match but went on to play the 1990 final with the same bow ties. At half-time, they had a drink of champagne on the pitch to recover from the efforts of the first half—and won what proved to be the club's last top-flight title for a quarter-century.

They were also famous for their love of nightlife, which attracted a lot of criticism, especially because so many of them had international duties with France. All this contributed to the image of Racing Club as an eccentric institution, but these players have also been seen as trail blazers for Stade Français's president Max Guazzini, who a few years later, took up the provocative (such as the use of the pink colour) and imaginative spirit to boost his club's image and shake off the conservative traditionalism of French rugby.

As the club hit the front pages, five players capitalised on the success and went on to start a sportswear clothing business called Eden Park (after the famous Auckland stadium) in late 1987. Their development was boosted when the French Federation chose them as official suppliers of France's formal wear in 1998. The company has 270 outlets throughout the world. One of them is in Richmond as Eden Park developed a partnership with Harlequins. Others are to be found in Northampton, Leeds, Belfast, Dublin and Cardiff. In 2003, Eden Park became the official supplier of the Welsh Rugby Union's formal wear for the World Cup in Australia. Eden Park is also directly involved in the Racing 92 club since one of its founders, Eric Blanc—who happens to be Franck Mesnel's brother-in-law, is the club's vice-president.

This particular period ended in the early 1990s when those players left the club. Racing then spent several years in the second division, but retained plenty of ambition. In 2007–08, Racing finished second on the ladder to equally ambitious Toulon, but fell short of promotion with an extra-time loss to Mont-de-Marsan in the Pro D2 promotion playoff final. The following year saw Racing's ambitions realised with a romp to the Pro D2 crown, clinching promotion with four rounds to spare.

In their return to the top flight in 2009–10, Racing finished sixth on the regular-season table, two spots ahead of their Parisian rivals, securing the final spot in the newly expanded playoffs—despite actually being outscored by their opponents on the season. This finish also gave Racing a place in the 2010–11 Heineken Cup. Their season ended with a 21–17 first-round loss at eventual champions Clermont. The 2010–11 season saw Racing emphatically, though only temporarily, reestablish themselves as the top club in Paris, finishing second on the regular-season table to Stade Français' 11th.

Lorenzetti's model for success has been to combine young French talent with big-name imports. More significantly, while he largely bankrolled the team during the first years of his tenure as president, he is committed to making the club self-supporting. To that end, he financed the construction of a new 32,000-seat stadium for the club in the Paris suburb of Nanterre, near La Défense. The new ground, known at its October 2017 opening as U Arena and renamed Paris La Défense Arena in June 2018, has been Racing's home since December 2017. It is also designed to host major concerts, potentially providing Racing with substantial non-match revenue.

Racing made headlines in December 2014, announcing that it had signed All Blacks fly-half Dan Carter, the all-time leading points scorer in international rugby, to a three-year deal effective after the 2015 Rugby World Cup. The contract reportedly made Carter the first player in rugby history to make £1 million (€1.3 million at late-2014 exchange rates) a season, with reports of his annual salary as high as £1.3 million (€1.7 million). When the signing was announced, Lorenzetti said, "Carter will be the best-paid player at Racing but also the least expensive because of the economic benefits." Carter filled the void at fly-half left by the return of Johnny Sexton to Leinster Rugby at the end of the 2014–15 season.

Still more recently, Racing became the first Top 14 side to establish a satellite club in the United States, signing a partnership agreement in 2016 with Austin Huns, a club from Austin, Texas that planned to turn fully professional. The partnership includes youth player development, player exchanges, Racing 92 exhibitions in Austin, and marketing.

Honours
 French Top 14
Champions (6): 1892, 1900, 1902, 1959, 1990, 2016
Runners-up (7): 1893, 1898, 1912, 1920, 1950, 1957, 1987
 European Rugby Champions Cup
Runners-up (3): 2015–16, 2017–18, 2019-20
 Challenge Yves du Manoir
Runners-up (1): 1952
Champion under 15 (1): 2005
Coupe de l'Espérance
Champions (1): 1918
Division One Group A2/Rugby Pro D2
Champions (2): 1998, 2009
Challenge Rutherford
Runners-up (1): 1952

Finals results

European Rugby Champions Cup

French championship

Challenge Yves du Manoir

Coupe de l'Espérance

Pro D2 promotion playoffs

Current standings

Current squad

The Racing 92 squad for the 2022–23 season is:

Espoirs squad

The Racing 92 Espoirs squad is:

Staff
 President: Jacky Lorenzetti
 Forwards Coach: Laurent Travers
 Backs Coach: Mike Prendergast
 Assistant coach: Casey Laulala
 Assistant coach: Chris Masoe
 Assistant coach: Patricio Noriega

Notable current and past players

  Patricio Albacete
  Emiliano Boffelli
  Manuel Carizza
  Álvaro Galindo
  Juan Martín Hernández
  Juan José Imhoff
  Juan Pablo Orlandi
  Agustín Pichot
  Kurtley Beale
  Nic Berry
  Olly Barkley
  Dan Scarbrough 
  Sireli Bobo
  Sakiusa Matadigo
  Josh Matavesi
  Leone Nakarawa
  Jone Qovu
  Simon Raiwalui
  Ben Volavola
  Albert Vulivuli
  Wladimir Aïtoff
  Georges André
  Marc Andreu
  Alexandre Audebert
  David Auradou
  Louis Béguet
  Laurent Benezech
  Eddy Ben Arous
  Léon Binoche
  Mathieu Blin
  Eric Bonneval
  François Borde
  René Boudreaux
  Adolphe Bousquet
  Guillaume Boussès
  Julien Brugnaut
  Marcel Burgun
  Laurent Cabannes
  Fernand Cazenave
  Sébastien Chabal
  Denis Charvet
  Camille Chat
  Henry Chavancy
  André Chilo
  Antonie Claassen
  Jean Collas
  Patrice Collazo
  René Crabos
  Michel Crauste
  Benjamin Dambielle
  Paul Decamps
  Jean-Frédéric Dubois
  Luc Ducalcon
  Brice Dulin
  Alexandre Dumoulin
  Nicolas Durand
  Yves du Manoir
  Fabrice Estebanez
  Benjamin Fall
  Jérôme Fillol
  Jean-Pierre Genet
  Charles Gondouin
  Pierre Guillemin
  Adolphe Jauréguy
  Adolphe Klingelhoefer
  Virgile Lacombe
  Jean-Baptiste Lafond
  Fabrice Landreau
  Gaston Lane
  Wenceslas Lauret
  Hubert Lefèbvre
  Bernard Le Roux
  Thomas Lombard
  Maxime Machenaud
  Gérald Martinez
  Arnaud Marquesuzaa
  Franck Mesnel
  François Moncla
  Lionel Nallet
  Benjamin Noirot
  Yannick Nyanga
  Robert Paparemborde
  Alexandre Pharamond
  Étienne Piquiral
  Adrien Planté
  Alain Porthault
  Frantz Reichel
  Jean-Pierre Rives
  André Roosevelt
  Émile Sarrade
  Julien Saubade
  Alfred Sauvy
  Laurent Sempéré
  Dimitri Szarzewski
  Rémi Tales
  Jacques Tati
  Teddy Thomas
  Franck Tournaire
  François Trinh-Duc
  Mikaele Tuugahala
  Virimi Vakatawa
  Ludovic Valbon
  Michel Vannier
  Jonathan Wisniewski
  Giorgi Chkhaidze
  Vasil Kakovin
  David Khinchagishvili
  Mamuka Magrakvelidze
  Mirco Bergamasco
  Martin Castrogiovanni
  Santiago Dellapè
  Carlo Festuccia
  Andrea Lo Cicero
  Andrea Masi
  Michael Carroll
  Donnacha Ryan
  Johnny Sexton
  Simon Zebo
  Dominic Bird
  Dan Carter
  Casey Laulala
  Johnny Leo'o
  Chris Masoe
  Andrew Mehrtens
  Joe Rokocoko
  Brent Ward
  Carlos de Candamo
  Jacques Cronjé
  Johan Goosen
  Juandré Kruger
  Pat Lambie
  Brian Mujati
  François Steyn
  François van der Merwe
  Gabriel Brezoianu
  Tudor Constantin
  Răzvan Mavrodin
  Adrian Motoc
  Cristian Petre
  Alin Petrache
  Eugeniu Ștefan
  Lucian Sirbu
  Ionuț Tofan
  Dumitru Volvoreanu
  Sefulu Gaugau
  Census Johnston
  Finn Russell
  Ben Tameifuna
  Soane Tonga'uiha
  Mani Vakaloa
  Dan Lydiate
  Jamie Roberts
  Mike Phillips
  Luke Charteris

Chairmen

See also
 List of rugby union clubs in France
 Rugby union in France

References

External links

 

 
Paris
Rugby clubs established in 1890
Rugby clubs established in 2001
Rugby union clubs in Paris
1890 establishments in France
2001 establishments in France
Sport in Hauts-de-Seine